Ilava District is a district in the Trenčín Region of western Slovakia. Until 1918, the district was part of the county of Kingdom of Hungary 
of Trencsén.

Municipalities

References 

Districts of Slovakia
Trenčín Region